The Promise is a play written in 1965 by Russian playwright Aleksei Arbuzov.  The story follows a young woman and two young men from their first meeting in a derelict room during the Siege of Leningrad in World War II; through the woman's marriage to one of the men, who turns out to be the "wrong" one; then finally to a new start with the "right" one.

Ariadne Nicolaeff's English translation of the play was produced in London in 1967, with a cast including Judi Dench, Ian McKellen and Ian McShane. A British reviewer called the play "Charmingly old-fashioned and chastely sentimental, [yet it] gave a lot of pleasure." This same production, with Eileen Atkins replacing Dench, opened on November 14, 1967, at Henry Miller's Theater in New York; it ran for 23 performances.

The play was profiled in the William Goldman book The Season: A Candid Look at Broadway.

References

External links
  (archive)
 

Russian plays
1965 plays